The Canal d'Aire is a French canal connecting the Canal de Neufossé in Aire-sur-la-Lys to the Canal de la Deûle in Bauvin.  It is a segment of the Canal Dunkerque-Escaut.

See also
 List of canals in France

References

External links
 Project Babel

Aire
Buildings and structures in Nord (French department)